Hekayati Molla Ibrahim-Khalil Kimyagar is the first comedy of the Azerbaijani writer and playwright Mirza Fatali Akhundov, written in 1850 in the Azerbaijani language.

According to Aziz Sharif, the comedy ridiculed the lovers of easy money - the citizens of Nukha, who believed in the alchemist’s power. At the same time, Sharif notes that a positive image is also derived in the comedy - the one of the poet Haji-Nuri, who considers his personal abilities and work to be the basis of a persons well-being. According to Hamid Algar, the dervish and mullah are the secondary targets of the satire in comedy, and Akhundov makes it clear in this play that he views religion as the equivalent of the superstition. Algar suggests that the Azerbaijani poet Mirza Shafi Vazeh could have been the prototype of the poet Haji-Nuri. Yashar Garaev and Fuad Gasimzade write that by creating the image of the poet Haji-Nuri in the artistic world of Akhundov, “the birth of light forces in society is also captured”.

See also 
 Eastern poem on the death of Pushkin

References

1850 plays
Azerbaijani-language literature
Works by Mirza Fatali Akhundzade